Erythroneura elegans is a species of leafhopper in the family Cicadellidae.
 The eggs of Erythroneura elegans may be parasitized by Anagrus epos, a species of fairyfly.

References

Further reading

External links

 

Erythroneurini